Bernin is a commune in the Isère department in southeastern France.

Population

Twin towns
Bernin is twinned with:

  Kieselbronn, Germany, since 1987

See also
Communes of the Isère department

References

Communes of Isère
Isère communes articles needing translation from French Wikipedia